Syllepte coelivitta is a moth in the family Crambidae. It was described by Francis Walker in 1866. It is found in Brazil, Suriname, Mexico and Panama.

References

Moths described in 1866
Moths of South America
Moths of Central America
coelivitta
Taxa named by Francis Walker (entomologist)